(sometimes also translated as "corporate bouncers", "meeting-men", or "corporate blackmailers") are specialized racketeers unique to Japan, and often associated with the yakuza, who extort money from or blackmail companies by threatening to publicly humiliate companies and their management, usually in their .

If a company does pay , the  will work to prevent others from embarrassing the company, either through intimidation or by disrupting the meeting so they cannot be heard.

History
 originated in the late 19th century. At this time, the unlimited liability of the management put the managers' personal fortune at risk in case of rumors and scandals. Hence the management hired protection, called , to reduce the risk of such rumors. Even after the Japanese laws included a limited liability, hence reducing the personal risk to the managers, these  continued to prosper, and were often used to quiet down otherwise difficult meetings. In that respect, they have even been compared to corporate lawyers in America.

In response to this, the  formed fake , announcing embarrassing company secrets, fictional or not, from loudspeakers mounted on trucks in order to extort money from companies.

In 1994, Juntarō Suzuki, vice president of Fujifilm, was murdered by  after he stopped paying these bribes.

Activities

Disrupting shareholder meetings
Individual  acquire enough stock from multiple companies in order to gain entrance to a shareholders' meeting. There, they disrupt the meeting (and embarrass the company) until their demands are met. For this, the  often research the company in detail beforehand to uncover incidents of misconduct or other company secrets, and then blackmail the management so that these issues are not raised in the shareholder meeting or elsewhere. Often, they also invent fictional issues that the company would have difficulty disproving.

Modern  have developed other, similar methods to accomplish their goals.

Other disruption
 also form fake groups, announcing embarrassing company secrets, fictional or not, from loudspeakers mounted on trucks in order to extort money from companies. They may also print special newspapers with topics embarrassing to companies, and then ask the company to buy the entire print at inflated prices, or even to subscribe to these newspapers, generating a steady flow of cash.

Preventing disruption of shareholder meetings
 have also been used by companies to drown out questions from legitimate shareholders which company officials do not want presented. One infamous case is related to Minamata disease (mercury poisoning), where the Chisso chemicals company managed to close a number of annual meetings within minutes, despite the presence of hundreds of protesters at the meetings. They have also been active against anti-war protesters and other people who may be viewed as a nuisance by the company at a particular time.

Countermeasures
Article 968 of the Japanese corporations code prohibits  activity, imposing imprisonment of no more than five years or a fine of no more than ¥5 million for "receiving, demanding or promising a proprietary benefit with regard to" statements or the exercise of voting rights at a shareholder or creditor meeting.

A practical countermeasure used by large corporations is to hold all shareholder meetings on the same day, so  cannot disrupt all of them.

Background

While in the West a shareholders' meeting is usually an earnest discussion between the shareholders and the management, in Japan it is often more of a ceremony, and the management does not feel the need to truly inform shareholders.

Companies that have bribed 
Major companies that have been found guilty of employing  include but are not limited to:

Mitsubishi, resulting in a number of arrests
Daiwa Securities Group
Nikko Securities
Nomura Securities Co., with three top executive pleading guilty for multimillion-dollar payments. In this case, the sōkaiya actually owned enough stock to propose one of their choosing as a member for the board of directors.
Nippon Shinpan, forcing the president Yoji Yamada into retirement after various executives paid up to ¥80 million to the subsequently arrested Kikuo Kondo of the Sumiyoshi-kai.
The Tokyo Electric Power Company
Meiji Seika

References

Further reading
 Baldwin, Frank, "Sōkaiya, the Idiom of Contemporary Japan", Japan Interpreter, 8, Winter 1974
 Ogino, Hiroshi, "The Sōkaiya's Grip on Corporate Japan", JQ, July–September, 1997
 Szymkowiak, Kenneth, "Sōkaiya Criminal Group and the Conflict for Corporate Power in Postwar Japan", Asia Profile, Vol. 20, No. 4, August, 1992
 Szymkowiak, Kenneth, "Sōkaiya: An Examination of the Social and Legal Development of Japan's Corporate Extortionist", International Journal of  the Sociology of Law, Vol. 22, 1994

External links

Japan faces fresh scandal, cnn.com, March 11, 1997
'Sokaiya' scams hit Japan, cnn.com, December 19, 1997
Executive quits over gangster charges, BBC News, 21 November 2002

Japanese business law
Japanese business terms
Racketeering
Yakuza